Julien Perrain (21 June 1902 – 14 April 1950) was a French racing cyclist. He rode in the 1929 Tour de France.

References

1902 births
1950 deaths
French male cyclists
Place of birth missing